The 2015 Meath Intermediate Football Championship is the 89th edition of the Meath GAA's premier club Gaelic football tournament for intermediate graded teams in County Meath, Ireland. The tournament consists of 18 teams, with the winner going on to represent Meath in the Leinster Intermediate Club Football Championship. The championship starts with a group stage and then progresses to a knock out stage.

The draw for the group stages of the championship were made on 9 February 2015 with the games commencing on the weekend of 10 April 2015.

Cortown were promoted to the middle grade after a 3-year exodus when securing the J.F.C. crown last year.

This was Oldcastle's return to the Intermediate grade after 5 years as a senior club since being relegated last year.

Clann na nGael were relegated tho the J.F.C. after 8 years in the middle grade.

On 4 October 2015, Ratoath claimed their first ever I.F.C. title (since beginning to field football teams in 1956) when overcoming Nobber 1-15 to 0-5 in Pairc Tailteann and hence earning promotion to the S.F.C. for the first time in their history.
After winning the Meath I.F.C. Ratoath also made history by winning their first Leinster Intermediate Club Football Championship and became only the second Meath club to win this honour after Wolfe Tones in 2004. They beat Athlone of Westmeath in the final.
Unfortunately their journey came to an end at the All-Ireland semi-final stage when losing to Kerry I.F.C. champions St. Mary's Cahirciveen who featured former All-Star and Kerry Bryan Sheehan.

Team changes
The following teams have changed division since the 2014 championship season.

From I.F.C.
Promoted to S.F.C.
 Ballinlough -  (Intermediate Champions)

Relegated to 2015 J.F.C.
 Carnaross

To I.F.C.
Relegated from 2013 S.F.C.
 Oldcastle

Promoted from 2014 J.F.C.
 Cortown - (Junior 'A' Champions)

Participating teams
The teams taking part in the 2015 Meath Intermediate Football Championship are:

Group stage

There are 3 groups called Group A,B and C. The 2 top finishers in each group and the third-place finisher in Group A will qualify for the Quarter Finals. The third placed teams in Group B and C will qualify for a Preliminary Quarter Final, with the winner earning a place in last eight. The bottom finishers of each group will qualify for the Relegation Play Off. The draw for the group stages of the championship were made on 9 February 2015 with the games commencing on the weekend of 10 April 2015.

Group A

Round 1
 Cortown 3-10, 1-9 Clann na nGael, Pairc Tailteann, 11/4/2015,
 Kilmainham 1-8, 0-5 Donaghmore/Ashbourne 'B', Walterstown, 11/4/2015,
 Nobber 1-14, 1-9 St. Michael's, Drumconrath, 12/4/2015,

Round 2
 Donaghmore/Ashbourne 'B' 1-6, 1-4 Clann na nGael, Walterstown, 19/4/2015,
 Kilmainham 2-9, 0-15 St. Michael's, Moynalty, 24/4/2015,
 Nobber 2-10, 0-5 Cortown, Carnaross, 24/4/2015,

Round 3
 Nobber 0-15, 0-8 Donaghmore/Ashbourne 'B', Dunsany, 22/5/2015,
 St. Michael's 0-12, 1-6 Cortown, Moynalty, 22/5/2015,
 Kilmainham 0-13, 0-8 Clann na nGael, Simonstown, 24/5/2015,

Round 4
 Nobber 1-10, 0-13 Kilmainham, Kilmainhamwood, 8/8/2015,
 Donaghmore/Ashbourne 'B' 0-13, 0-6 Cortown, Skryne, 8/8/2015,
 St. Michael's 0-14, 1-8 Clann na nGael, Kells, 9/8/2015,

Round 5
 St. Michael's 0-13, 2-7 Donaghmore/Ashbourne 'B', Brews Hill, 21/8/2015,
 Nobber 2-12, 0-5 Clann na nGael, Moynalty, 21/8/2015,
 Kilmainham 1-17, 0-6 Cortown, Carnaross, 21/8/2015,

Group B

Round 1
 Dunderry 1-15, 1-6 Ballivor, Cortown, 10/4/2015,
 Ratoath 6-11, 0-12 Trim, Dunsany, 12/4/2015,
 Castletown 0-10, 0-8 St. Ultan's, Simonstown, 17/4/2015,

Round 2
 Trim 1-9, 1-8 Dunderry, Cortown, 17/4/2015,
 Ballivor 2-10, 1-4 St. Ulatn's, Trim, 23/4/2015,
 Ratoath 3-9, 1-9 Castletown, Duleek, 25/4/2015,

Round 3
 Ratoath 2-18, 3-7 Dunderry, Walterstown, 24/5/2015,
 St. Ultan's 0-12, 0-11 Trim, Athboy, 26/5/2015,
 Ballivor 0-9, 0-7 Castletown, Bohermeen, 27/5/2015,

Round 4
 Dunderry 1-10, 1-6 St. Ultan's, Pairc Tailteann, 9/8/2015,
 Ratoath 1-16, 0-5 Ballivor, Trim, 9/8/2015,
 Trim 3-12, 2-12 Castletown, Simonstown, 9/8/2015,

Round 5
 Ratoath 3-8, 0-6 St. Ultan's, Kilmessan, 23/8/2015,
 Trim 2-10, 1-11 Ballivor, Athboy, 23/8/2015,
 Castletown 3-9, 0-9 Dunderry, Kilmainham, 23/8/2015,

Group C

Round 1
 St. Colmcille's 1-11, 0-6 Ballinabrackey, Skryne, 10/4/2015,
 Oldcastle 1-8, 0-9 Drumbaragh Emmets, Ballinlough, 12/4/2015,
 Syddan 1-12, 1-11 Longwood, Bective, 12/4/2015,

Round 2
 Ballinabrackey 1-15, 0-7 Longwood, Trim, 18/4/2015,
 St. Colmcille's 1-9, 1-9 Oldcastle, Castletown, 25/4/2015,
 Drumbaragh Emmets 3-10, 0-13 Syddan, Pairc Tailteann, 26/4/2015,

Round 3
 St. Colmcille's 1-21, 2-7 Syddan, Slane, 22/5/2015,
 Ballinabrackey 4-9, 1-5 Oldcastle, Brews Hill, 23/5/2015,
 Longwood 0-15, 1-10 Drumbaragh Emmets, Kildalkey, 26/5/2015,

Round 4
 Ballinabrackey 2-14, 0-10 Drumbaragh Emmets, Pairc Tailteann, 8/8/2015,
 Syddan 2-12, 1-8 Oldcastle, Carlanstown, 9/8/2015,
 St. Colmcille's 3-19, 0-5 Longwood, Trim, 9/8/2015,

Round 5
 Ballinabrackey 1-12, 2-9 Syddan, Athboy, 22/8/2015,
 St. Colmcille's 2-11, 1-7 Drumbaragh Emmets, Drumconrath, 22/8/2015,
 Oldcastle 0-9, 1-6 Longwood, Dunderry, 22/8/2015,

Knock-out Stages

Relegation Play Off
The three bottom finishers from each group qualify for the relegation play off and play each other in a round robin basis.
The team with the worst record after two matches will be relegated to the 2016 Junior Championship.

 Game 1: St. Ultan's 2-16, 0-7 Clann na nGael, Kilmainham, 5/9/2015,
 Game 2: Drumbaragh Emmets 2-18, 1-11 Clann na nGael, Brews Hill, 11/9/2015,

Finals
The winners and runners up of each group qualify for the quarter finals along with the third placed finisher of Group A.

Preliminary Quarter-Final:
 Castletown 0-15, 0-9 Syddan, Meath Hill, 30/8/2015,

Quarter-Finals:
 St. Colmcille's 0-19, 0-9 St. Michael's, Duleek, 4/9/2015,
 Nobber 2-18, 2-9 Castletown, Drumconrath, 5/9/2015,
 Ratoath 4-10, 0-8 Ballinabrackey, Trim, 5/9/2015,
 Trim 1-12, 1-8 Kilmainham, Athboy, 6/9/2015,

Semi-Finals:
 Ratoath 1-13, 0-10 St. Colmcille's, Duleek, 21/9/2015,
 Nobber 0-16, 1-11 Trim, Simonstown, 22/9/2015, (A.E.T.) 

Final:
 Ratoath 1-15, 0-5 Nobber, Pairc Tailteann, 4/10/2015,

Leinster Intermediate Club Football Championship
Preliminary Round:
 St. Patrick's Donabate 0-11, 2-12 Ratoath, Donabate, 17/10/2015,

Quarter-Final:
 Ratoath 2-19, 0-6 Railyard, Ratoath, 1/11/2015,

Semi-Final:
 Ratoath 3-13, 1-6 Castledermot, Ratoath, 15/11/2015,

Final:
 Athlone 2-9, 2-13 Ratoath, Cusack Park, 29/11/2015,

All-Ireland Intermediate Club Football Championship

Semi-Final:
 St. Mary's Cahirciveen 2-20, 1-5 Ratoath, Gaelic Grounds, 24/1/2016,

References

External links

Meath Intermediate Football Championship
Meath Intermediate Football Championship